Pratapsingh (also known as Pratap Singh, Partap Singh, Pratab Singh, Partab Singh, or Partapsingh) may refer to:

Maharana Pratap Singh of Mewar (1540–1597), Rajasthan
Partap Singh Kairon, Chief Minister of Punjab
Partap Singh (1904–1984), Jathedar of Akal Takht
Partap Singh, Sikh priest.
Pratap Singh (cricketer) (born 1993), Indian cricketer
Pratap Singh (Madhya Pradesh politician)
Pratap Singh (politician), member of the Rajasthan Legislative Assembly
Pratap Singh (referee) (born 1971), Indian football referee
Pratap Singh (Sikh prince) (1831–1843), heir apparent of the Sikh Empire
Pratap Singh Bajwa, Indian politician.
Pratap Singh Giani, Sikh academician.
Pratap Singh II (1724–1753), Maharana of Mewar, India, 1751–1754
Pratap Singh Nabha (1919–1995), Maharaja of Nabha, India, 1928–1995 
Pratap Singh of Idar (1845–1922), Maharaja of Idar, India, 1902–1911
Pratap Singh of Jaipur (1764–1803), ruler of Jaipur 1778–1803
Pratap Singh of Jammu and Kashmir (1848–1925), Maharaja of Jammu and Kashmir
Pratap Singh of Kapurthala (1871–1911), Punjabi politician and scholar
Pratap Singh of Thanjavur (died 1763), King of Thanjavur Maratha kingdom from 1739–1763
Pratap Singh Rao Gaekwad, Maharaja of Baroda.
Pratap Singh Shah, king of Nepal.
Pratap Singh, Maharana of Mewar
Pratap Singh, Raja of Satara (1793–1847), Nominal King of Maratha Empire, Satara - 1808–1839
Pratapsingh of Jaipur, the ruler of Jaipur from 1778 to 1803
Pratapsingh of Thanjavur, the Maratha ruler of Thanjavur from 1739 to 1763
Pratapsingh Rane, Indian politician.

See also